Mishukovo is a rural locality (a village) in Vozhbalskoye Rural Settlement, Totemsky  District, Vologda Oblast, Russia. The population was 20 as of 2002.

Geography 
Mishukovo is located 43 km west of Totma (the district's administrative centre) by road. Pakhtusovo is the nearest rural locality.

References 

Rural localities in Tarnogsky District